is a railway station in Kita-ku, Nagoya, Aichi Prefecture, Japan.

It was opened on

Lines

 (Station number: K01)
Nagoya Railroad (Meitetsu)
Komaki Line

Layout
The platforms are as follows:

Platforms

Adjacent stations

|-
!colspan=5|Nagoya Railroad

References

External links
 

Railway stations in Japan opened in 1931
Railway stations in Aichi Prefecture
Stations of Nagoya Municipal Subway